Hörmann is a German surname. Notable people with the surname include:

Judith Hörmann (born 1983), German sprint canoeist
Ludwig Hörmann (1918–2001), German cyclist
Raimund Hörmann (born 1957), German rower
Silke Hörmann (born 1986), German sprint canoeist
Theodor von Hörmann (1840–1895), Austrian landscape painter
Walter Hörmann (born 1961), Austrian footballer and manager
Xaver Hörmann (1910–1943), German sprint canoeist

German-language surnames
Surnames from given names